The Sucklord (born Morgan Phillips March 27, 1969)) is a New York pop artist. He manufactures unlicensed action figures and toys through his company, Suckadelic. The Sucklord appeared as a contestant in the second season of Work of Art: The Next Great Artist.  On September 10, 2012, the Sucklord appeared in the fifth episode of Bravo's Gallery Girls reality TV show, in which he produced limited editions of action figures and sold them at the girls' East Village shop, End of Century.

The Sucklord has been a long-time fan of Star Wars and Star Wars merchandise and has been profiled for his own versions of Star Wars collectibles. He contributed to series five and six of Topps' Star Wars Galaxy trading cards and produced three series of his own Suckpax cards.

Phillips was born in the West Village and attended P.S. 41 and the High School for the Humanities, graduating in 1987.  He later attended an art school in Eugene, Oregon. Phillips made his first reality TV appearance in the 2004 premiere episode of VH1's Can't Get a Date. Phillips produced the YouTube shows Toylords of Chinatown and Microsexuals.

Exhibition
January 2011, Suckadelic, Boo-Hooray Gallery, New York City.

References

External links

Living people
Artists from New York (state)
American pop artists
1969 births
Participants in American reality television series